Pardoe is a surname, and may refer to:

Blaine Pardoe, American science fiction writer and military historian
 Geoffrey Pardoe (1928–1996), English rocket scientist
Glyn Pardoe (born 1946), English former footballer
John Pardoe (born 1934), retired British businessman and Liberal Party politician
Julia Pardoe (1806–1862), English poet and novelist
Margot Pardoe (1902–1996), English children's author
 Matthew Pardoe (born 1991), English cricketer
 T. Earl Pardoe (1885–1971), American drama teacher
Thomas Pardoe (1770–1823), English enameler
Thomas Pardoe (boxer) (1911–1992), English boxer

See also
Pardo (disambiguation)

English-language surnames